Marjorie Pigott  (born January 6, 1904 in Yokohama, Japan, died January 12, 1990 in Toronto, Ontario, Canada) was a Japanese Canadian artist, who adapted Japanese watercolour techniques to paint Canadian scenes.

Marjorie Pigott was born to an English father and a Japanese mother, who, recognizing Pigott's artistic talent, sent her to study under master artists at the Nanga School, founded in the 15th century. Her mother was of noble birth and their home was filled with ancient Japanese treasures, which were mostly destroyed during the 1923 Great Kantō earthquake. 

After 12 years of study Pigott was designated a Nanga master herself. With World War II looming, Pigott left Japan together with her sister Edith, arriving in Vancouver in 1940 and settling in Toronto. From 1955 to 1965 she taught the Nanga technique to Japanese in Canada. She started painting Canadian scenes, such as the landscapes around Muskoka, using the Nanga technique and gradually developed her own style of semi-abstract wet-into-wet watercolour painting.

Her work was exhibited in several solo exhibitions and group shows in Canada. Her work is represented in collections of the National Gallery of Canada among others. She was a member of and exhibited her work with the Canadian Sociery of Painters in Water Colour and the Ontario Society of Artists. She was elected to the Royal Canadian Academy of Arts in 1973.

Solo exhibitions
Her solo exhibitions include the following:
1962, 1964, 1966, 1968 - Roberts Gallery, Toronto
1969 - Kensington Fine Arts Gallery, Calgary
1970 - Roberts Gallery, Toronto
1971 - Wallack Gallery, Ottawa
1972 - Gallery Fore, Winnipeg; Kensington Fine Arts Gallery, Calgary; Roberts Gallery, Toronto
1973 - Wallack Gallery, Ottawa
1974 - Roberts Gallery, Toronto
1975 - Wallack Gallery, Ottawa

Group exhibitions
Her group exhibitions include the following:

1961 - 4th Biennial Exhibition of Canadian Art, Ottawa; Canadian National Exhibition Art Gallery, Toronto; London Regional Art Gallery
1962, 1963 - Annuals of the Art Gallery of Hamilton
1964 - Spring Exhibition of Montreal Museum of Fine Arts; St. Catherines Arts Council

References

Canadian women artists
1904 births
1990 deaths
Canadian watercolourists
Japanese emigrants to Canada
People from Yokohama
Women watercolorists